Anthidium atricaudum is a species of bee in the family Megachilidae, the leaf-cutter, carder, or mason bees.

Distribution
Chile
Peru

Synonyms
Synonyms for this species include:
Anthidium piliventre Friese, 1925 (homonym)

References

atricaudum
Insects described in 1926